Sir Alexander Drummond Gibson  (11 February 1926 – 14 January 1995) was a Scottish conductor and opera intendant. He was also well known for his service to the BBC and his achievements during his reign as the longest serving principal conductor of  the Royal Scottish National Orchestra in which the orchestra was awarded its Royal Patronage.

Biography 
Gibson was born in Motherwell in 1926 and brought up in the village of New Stevenston, the son of James McClure Gibson and his wife Wilhelmina Williams.

He was introduced to professional opera at the age of 12 when his parents took him to a performance of Madam Butterfly at the Theatre Royal in Glasgow.  He was educated at Dalziel High School. He excelled at the piano and organ, and at 18 became the organist at Hillhead Congregational Church, Glasgow while studying music at the Royal Scottish Academy of Music and Drama in Glasgow. In 1943 he matriculated at the University of Glasgow to study Music and English. After his first year, however, the war interrupted his studies and he served with the Royal Signals Band until 1948 when he took up a scholarship to the Royal College of Music in London, after which Sir Alexander Gibson studied at the Mozarteum, Salzburg under Igor Markevitch, and under Paul Van Kempen at the Accademia Chigiana, Siena.

He was Assistant Conductor of the BBC Scottish Symphony Orchestra 1952–54 and conducted two productions for the amateur Glasgow Grand Opera Society in 1954.  At the time of his appointment in 1957 as musical director of Sadler's Wells, he was the youngest ever to have taken that position. He met his wife Veronica at Sadlers Wells and they married in 1958.

Returning to Glasgow, in 1959 he became the first Scottish principal conductor and artistic director of the  Scottish National Orchestra, a post he held until 1984, to date longer than any other conductor. Under his leadership the orchestra built an international reputation through recordings and foreign tours and appeared regularly in the SNO Proms in Glasgow, in Edinburgh International Festival, where he also created the Edinburgh Festival Chorus, and in London at The Proms.

Gibson created and launched Scottish Opera in 1962 and was its music director until 1986. Through his artistic achievements the Theatre Royal, Glasgow was bought from Scottish Television and transformed in 1975 to be the first national opera house in Scotland, and the home theatre of Scottish Opera and of Scottish Ballet, and from 1980 the Scottish Theatre Company. In 1987, Gibson was appointed conductor laureate of Scottish Opera and held this title for the remainder of his life. From 1981 to 1983 he was also principal guest conductor of the Houston Symphony Orchestra. He was principal conductor of the Guildford Philharmonic. During his career he made guest appearances with all the major British orchestras and extensively throughout Europe, Australia, the Americas, Hong Kong and Japan.

Honours 

His many awards include two Grand Prix International de l’Academie Charles Cros Awards, the Sibelius Medal in 1978, and honorary doctorates from Aberdeen, Glasgow, Newcastle, Stirling, York and the Open universities. He was made a Commander of the Order of the British Empire (CBE) in 1967, was created a Knight Bachelor in 1977 and became president of the Royal Scottish Academy of Music and Drama, where in his memory, the Alexander Gibson School of Opera was opened in 1998. It is the first purpose-built opera school in Great Britain.

Gibson had a particular affinity for Scandinavian music, particularly Jean Sibelius, whose work he recorded several times, and Carl Nielsen. He was awarded Finland's Sibelius Medal in recognition of his distinguished service to the composer's music. He was strongly committed to contemporary music and in 1961 he founded a new music festival in Glasgow originally called Musica Viva, later Musica Nova Festival, Glasgow. Among the many important premieres he conducted there was the first British performance of Gruppen by Karlheinz Stockhausen, in 1961. He was also a constant advocate of new music by Scottish composers.  In the opera house he was regarded as a particularly fine interpreter of Mozart and Wagner, conducting the complete Ring des Nibelungen with Scottish Opera in 1971. He was equally at home in the Italian repertoire. In 1969 he conducted a memorable Scottish Opera production of Les Troyens by Berlioz  –  the first ever complete performance of both parts of the opera in one evening.

Gibson was the recipient of the 1970 St Mungo Prize, awarded to the individual who has done most in the previous three years to improve and promote the city of Glasgow.

Death 
Sir Alexander Gibson died in December 1995 from complications following a heart attack. He was 68. He was survived by his wife Veronica and their four children.

Legacy 

Sir Alexander Gibson's mission was to make classical music and opera accessible to all, and throughout his career he devotedly encouraged musicians and singers to rise to the very best of their abilities. His discography is detailed in the biography of him by Conrad Wilson, as are the numerous premieres, concert works and operas he conducted.  In the Theatre Royal, Glasgow there is a lofty portrait of him in the orchestra pit perched on a stool, painted by David Donaldson, the Queen's Limner in Scotland, and a bust of him as conductor by the sculptor Archie Forrest. 
A street in his home town of Motherwell, is named Alexander Gibson Way in his honour.

Sources

New York Times
Scottish Opera – the first ten years by Conrad Wilson, 1972 
It's a Curious Story – The Tale of Scottish Opera 1962–1987 by Cordelia Oliver, 1987 
 Alex – the Authorised Biography by Conrad Wilson, 1993 
 The Theatre Royal : Entertaining a Nation by Graeme Smith, 2008 
  Playing for Scotland:History of the Royal Scottish Orchestra. By Conrad Wilson, published in 1993 by Collins

External links
 
Alexander Gibson biography at the Royal Society of Edinburgh 
Ancestral information from descendant Thomas K. Gibson
information about the Theatre Royal and Sir Alexander Gibson

1926 births
1995 deaths
Alumni of the Royal Conservatoire of Scotland
Scottish conductors (music)
British male conductors (music)
Music directors (opera)
People from Motherwell
Fellows of the Royal Society of Edinburgh
Knights Bachelor
Scottish knights
Conductors (music) awarded knighthoods
People educated at Dalziel High School
Alumni of the University of Glasgow
Alumni of the Royal College of Music
British Army personnel of World War II
Scottish soldiers
Commanders of the Order of the British Empire
Royal Scottish Academicians
Opera in Scotland
20th-century Scottish musicians
20th-century British conductors (music)
Royal Corps of Signals soldiers
20th-century male musicians